Philatelic International (Filintern) was an international philatelic society of collector-workers. It was founded and based in the Soviet Union in the 1920s to 1940s.

History 
The creation of the Filintern was set up at a conference in Moscow in 22 to 30 June 1924. Its formation was greeted by all branches of the All-Russian Society of Philatelists and at the same time by the Soviet Esperantists. At the conference opening, Feodor Chuchin, the Commissioner for Philately and Scripophily, declared:

A program for the Filintern's central organ was developed that included:
 "propaganda of the international union of philatelist-workers of all nations for the struggle against organised philatelist-dealers",
 "wide popularisation of ideological philately",
 "introducing Esperanto into philately and thus the establishment of lively communication between philatelists around the world."

Filintern facilitates the goals of philatelists, scripophilists and Esperantists. Within Filintern, they could:
 collect stamps and paper money,
 publish philatelic bulletins, journals and catalogues,
 most importantly, conduct foreign exchange.

Using philately, scripophily and Esperanto, the Soviet authorities also hoped for promoting communist propaganda among the foreign proletariat. Filintern received a further boost from the SAT (Sennacieca Asocio Tutmonda) Congress of 1926.

The Philatelic International's organ was the journal . It was an insert included in the monthly magazine Soviet Philatelist or Soviet Collector. Its Editor was a prominent Russian philatelist L. K. Eichfuss. The first issue of the journal appeared in January 1925.

See also 
 All-Russian Society of Philatelists
 First All-Union Philatelic Exhibition
 International trading tax stamp
 Leniniana (philately)
 Moscow Society of Philatelists and Collectors
 Organisation of the Commissioner for Philately and Scripophily
 Soviet Philatelic Association
 Soviet Philatelist

Notes

References

Further reading 
  Archived from the original and another source on 2015-05-15.

External links 
 

Philately of the Soviet Union
Esperanto history
1924 establishments in the Soviet Union
1940s disestablishments in the Soviet Union
Defunct international non-governmental organizations
Comintern
Philatelic organizations
Organizations established in 1924
Esperanto in Russia